During the 2022 Russian invasion of Ukraine a number of Soviet-era monuments and memorials were destroyed or removed, or commitments to remove them were announced in former Eastern Bloc countries, as well as several other countries.

Background 
In November 2022, the Estonian Ministry of Foreign Affairs counted 322 monuments and tombstones that 'may be subject to removal'. The list was not made public. 

On July 14, 2022, Latvian Saeima approved the removal of 69 monuments, memorials, and other objects glorifying Soviet and Nazi regimes selected by the Heritage Administration, the Latvian Artists Union and Museum of the Occupation of Latvia. By 14 November, all 69 monuments had been removed, as well as an additional 55 Nazi and Soviet glorifying objects removed on the municipalities' own initiative.

Monuments removed

See also 
 Anti-Sovietism
 Decommunization
 Demolition of monuments to Vladimir Lenin in Ukraine

References

Soviet
removed monuments and memorials
Reactions to the 2022 Russian invasion of Ukraine
Removed monuments and memorials
Anti-communism
Decommunization
Anti-Russian sentiment